Sydney Owen (27 February 1872 – 24 February 1925) was an English cricketer. He played in three first-class matches for the Jamaican cricket team in 1896/97.

See also
 List of Jamaican representative cricketers

References

External links
 

1872 births
1925 deaths
English cricketers
Jamaica cricketers
People from Southsea